The International Grace of God Church (Portuguese: Igreja Internacional da Graça de Deus) is a Brazilian charismatic evangelical church.

History 
Romildo Ribeiro Soares had worked with bishop Edir Macedo of the Universal Church of the Kingdom of God, but they broke off relations in 1978, after disagreements in theology. In 1980, Soares founded the International Grace of God Church, at Rua Lauro Neiva in the city of Rio de Janeiro.

The Church's first temple opened in the city of Duque de Caxias, Rio de Janeiro, followed by others throughout Brazil and in other countries.

The International Church of God's Grace is accepted and recognized as a "Legitimate Christian Fellowship Church" by other denominations and their respective ministers.

Network 
 there are more than 2,000 International Grace of God churches throughout Brazil, from the north to the south, and churches in Lisbon, Portugal; Pompano Beach, Florida; Miami, Florida; Orlando, Florida; Brandon, Florida; New Jersey; Corona, New York; Somerville, Massachusetts; and Fall River, Massachusetts in the United States.

Media 
In 1999, the International Grace of God Church founded a network of television stations called RIT (International Network Television) in major cities in Brazil. They display a daily program on a prime-time network, Bandeirantes, and at night show Faith Show, with Soares as preacher.

 the church had a television program called "Faith Show", broadcast during primetime on Rede Bandeirantes and in the mornings and afternoons on Rede TV.

There is daily worship at the international headquarters of the International Grace of God Church in Sao Paulo, with services performed by Soares.

Beliefs 
The denomination has a charismatic confession of faith.

References

External links
 IIGD Official English language website (United States)
 Nossa Rádio USA

Pentecostal churches in Brazil
International Grace of God Church
Charismatic denominations